Anatoly Borisovich Kuznetsov (31 December 1930 – 7 March 2014) was a Soviet and Russian actor, best known for his role of the Red Army soldier Fyodor Sukhov in White Sun of the Desert (1970). His cousin Mikhail was also an actor. Anatoly Kuznestov was named as People's Artist of the RSFSR in 1979. He lived and worked in Moscow.

Biography
Kuznetsov was born and grew up in Moscow, in the family of Russian singer Boris Kuznetsov. He studied music at the Ippolitov-Ivanov Music School, but later went into acting and graduated from the Moscow Art Theatre School in 1955. Since 1958 he worked at the Moscow Film Actor Theater. He broke into films playing one of the main characters in Dangers Trails with Druzhnikov while been a student.

Death
He died on 7 March 2014 at the age of 83.

Selected filmography

 Opasnye tropy (1955) - Nikolay Zholudev
 Gost s Kubani (1956) - Nikolay Vorobtsov
 Za vitrinoy univermaga (1956) - Lieutenant
 Puteshestvie v molodost (1957) - Petrov
 Sluchay na shakhte vosem (1958) - Batanin
 K Chyornomu moryu (1958) - Nikolay Kukushkin
 Na dorogakh voyny (1959) - Sushkov
 Povest o molodozhyonakh (1960) - Volodya
 Yasha Toporkov (1960)
 Zhdite pisem (1960) - Lionka
 My Friend, Kolka! (1961) - Rudenko
 Kak ya byl samostoyatelnym (1963) - Lyosha's father
 Utrenniye poyezda (1963) - Paul
 Samolyoty ne prizemlilis (1964) - (voice)
 Give Me a Book of Complaints (1965) - Ivan Kondakov
 Sovest (1966) - Martyanov
 Krylya pesni (1967) - Musa (voice)
 Woman's World (1967) - Zhan
 Vesna na Odere (1968) - Lubentsov
 Vstrechi na rassvete (1969)
 Unterwegs zu Lenin (1969) - Sekretär des Kreiskomitees
 White Sun of the Desert (1970) - Fyodor Sukhov
 Meine Stunde Null (1970) - Oberleutnant Gornin
 Otkradnatiyat vlak (1971) - General Petr Petrovich
 Liberation (1971, part 4) - Zakharov
 Hot Snow (1972) - Vesnin
 Kato pesen (1973) - Ruski ofitzer
 Zhizn na greshnoy zemle (1973)
 I na Tikhom Okeane... (1974) - Ilya Gerasimovich Peklevanov
 Okovani soferi (1975) - Sergejev
 Bratyuzhka (1976) - Ales Ivanovich Kazanok
 Zhit po-svoyemu (1976) - Vasiliy Balyshev
 Jeden stribrny (1976) - Laco Tatar
 Incognito from St. Petersburg (1978) - Lyapkin-Tyapkin
 In the Zone of Special Attention (1978) - Mayor Morozhkyn
 Pravo pervoy podpisi (1978) - Sergey Andreyevich Savelyev
 Posledniy shans (1978)
 Rodnoe delo (1979) - Grachev
 Vtoraya vesna (1980)
 Hordubal (1980) - Hordubal
 Otvetnyy khod (1981) - Morozhkyn
 Sluchay v kvadrate '36-80''' (1982) - General Pavlov
 Polosa vezeniya (1983) - (segment "Polosa vezeniya")
 Kometa (1984)
 Sand-Glass (1984)
 Copper Angel (1984) - Engineer Kurmayev
 Reportazh s linii ognya (1985)
 Liberty Is on the Opposite Bank (1985)
 Five Minutes of Fear (1985)
 Misty Shores (1986) - Polkovnik Egoriev
 Pyat minut strakha (1986) - Kornilov
 Byla ne byla (1986) - Yuriy
 Without Sun (1987)
 Shakaly (1990) - Deputy
 Nipple System (1990)
 Russian Roulette (1990)
 Letuchiy gollandets (1990) - Matvey Fomich
 Dinosaurs of 20th Century (1990)
 Genius (1992) - Valentin Smirnov - Nastya's father
 Tractor Drivers 2 (1992) - farm director, Maryana's father
 Stambulskiy tranzit (1993)
 Usnuvshiy passazhir (1994) - Aleksandr Ivanovich Smirnov
 Shirli-Myrli (1995) - Father
 Za co? (1996) - Ivan Gavrilovich komendant
 Rayskoye yablochko (1998) - Igor Igorevich
 Chernaya metka (2003) - Heydar Aliev (voice)
 Turkish Gambit (2005)
 Nobody Knows About Sex (2006) - Yegor's grandfather
 Den pobedy (2007) - Andrei Nikolenko - Veteran of war

References

External links
 
 Anatoly Kuznetsov at peoples.ru
Anatoly Kuznetsov at kino-teatr.ru

1930 births
2014 deaths
20th-century Russian male actors
21st-century Russian male actors
Male actors from Moscow
Moscow Art Theatre School alumni
Honored Artists of the RSFSR
People's Artists of the RSFSR
Recipients of the Order "For Merit to the Fatherland", 4th class
Recipients of the Order of Honour (Russia)
State Prize of the Russian Federation laureates
United Russia politicians
Russian male film actors
Russian male stage actors
Soviet male film actors

Soviet male stage actors
Suicides by poison
Burials at Novodevichy Cemetery